Ipecacuanha may refer to:

 a synonym of Psychotria, a genus of flowering plants in the family Rubiaceae
 the common name of Carapichea ipecacuanha, a species of flowering plant in the family Rubiaceae, the roots of which were used to make syrup of ipecac
 a fictional ship in H. G. Wells's The Island of Doctor Moreau

See also
Ruellia geminiflora, known locally as ipecacuanha-da-flor-roxa
Solanum ipecacuanha, an obsolete name of Solanum pseudocapsicum, a nightshade species

Historically recognized Rubiaceae genera